A List of mountain ranges of the Sonoran Desert.  Many of the mountains of southern Arizona are included, excluding the Madrean Sky Island ranges of southeast Arizona, extreme southwest New Mexico, or northeast Sonora, Mexico.

The Mojave Desert lies to the northwest; also in the northwest and west are mountain ranges of the lower elevation Colorado Desert, (west of the north-south section of the Colorado River of the Lower Colorado River Valley, in the southeast California deserts.)

Mountain ranges on the Baja California Peninsula east of the cordillera spine mountains are included. The middle section of the peninsula is the Vizcaino Desert; a few ranges are from the very south in Baja California Sur.

Alphabetical list

Agua Caliente Mountains
Aguila Mountains
Belmont Mountains
Big Horn Mountains (Arizona)
Big Maria Mountains
Little Maria Mountains
Bryan Mountains
Buckskin Mountains (Arizona)
Bradshaw Mountains
Cabeza Prieta Mountains
Cargo Muchacho Mountains
Castle Dome Mountains
Chocolate Mountains
Chocolate Mountains (Arizona)
Chuckwalla Mountains
Copper Mountains
Crater Range
Dome Rock Mountains
Eagletail Mountains
Gila Bend Mountains
Gila Mountains (Yuma County)
Goldfield Mountains
Granite Wash Mountains
Harcuvar Mountains–NE. La Paz County  -- (SW. Yavapai County)
Harquahala Mountains–E. La Paz County -- (W. Maricopa County)
Little Harquahala Mountains
Hieroglyphic Mountains–Maricopa County -- (some in S. Yavapai County)
Kofa Mountains–N. Yuma County - (S. La Paz County)
Laguna Mountains (Arizona)–Yuma County (see also: Laguna Mountains(Calif))
Little Buckskin Mountains
Little Harquahala Mountains
Harquahala Mountains
( Little Horn Mountains–S. La Paz County -- (N. Yuma County) )
Little Maria Mountains
Little Mule Mountains
Mule Mountains (California)
Big Maria Mountains
Maricopa Mountains
( Mazatzal Mountains–Southeast Yavapai County -- (and N. Maricopa, W. Gila County) )
McCoy Mountains
McDowell Mountains
Middle Mountains–S. La Paz County -- (N. Yuma County)
Mohawk Mountains
Muggins Mountains
Mule Mountains (California)
Little Mule Mountains
New Water Mountains–S. La Paz County -- (connected to Kofa Mountains, N. Yuma County)
Nopah Range
Painted Rock Mountains
Palomas Mountains
Plomosa Mountains
Phoenix Mountains
Riverside Mountains
Sand Tank Mountains
Salt River Mountains
Sierra Arida
Sierra de la Lechuguilla
Sierra Estrella
Sierra Pinta
Silver Bell Mountains
West Silver Bell Mountains
Tank Mountains
Tinajas Altas Mountains
Trigo Mountains
Tule Mountains
Turtle Mountains (California)-(borders the Mojave Desert)
Usery Mountains–Maricopa County -- (See: Usery Mountain Recreation Area.)
Vulture Mountains
Waterman Mountains
West Silver Bell Mountains
Silver Bell Mountains
Whipple Mountains-(borders the Mojave Desert)
White Tank Mountains

Colorado Desert, southeast Lower California

Big Maria Mountains
Cargo Muchacho Mountains
Chocolate Mountains
Chuckwalla Mountains
Little Maria Mountains
Little Mule Mountains
McCoy Mountains
Mule Mountains (California)
Nopah Range
Riverside Mountains
Turtle Mountains (California)-(borders the Mojave Desert)
Whipple Mountains-(borders the Mojave Desert)

Mountain ranges of Mexico

Baja California

Baja California Sur

Mountain ranges of the United States

La Paz County, Arizona
The mostly east-west flowing Bill Williams River forms the northern border of La Paz County, Arizona with Mohave County to the north. This is an approximate delimiting line between the Mojave Desert north and northwest, and to the Sonoran Desert to the south, east, and southeast. The Colorado Desert-(subsection of the Sonoran) lies across the Colorado River to the west, but intergrades into the higher elevation Mojave Desert northwestwards.

Buckskin Mountains (Arizona)
Chocolate Mountains (Arizona)
Dome Rock Mountains
Granite Wash Mountains
Harcuvar Mountains–NE. La Paz County  -- (SW. Yavapai County)
Harquahala Mountains–E. La Paz County -- (W. Maricopa County)
(Kofa Mountains–N. Yuma County - (S. La Paz County) )
Little Buckskin Mountains
Little Harquahala Mountains
( Little Horn Mountains–S. La Paz County -- (N. Yuma County) )
Middle Mountains–S. La Paz County -- (N. Yuma County)
New Water Mountains
Plomosa Mountains
Trigo Mountains

Maricopa County, Arizona

Belmont Mountains
Big Horn Mountains (Arizona)
Crater Range
Eagletail Mountains
Gila Bend Mountains
Goldfield Mountains
( Harquahala Mountains–E. La Paz County -- (W. Maricopa County) )
Hieroglyphic Mountains–Maricopa County -- (some in S. Yavapai County)
Maricopa Mountains
( Mazatzal Mountains–Southeast Yavapai County -- (and N. Maricopa, W. Gila County) )
McDowell Mountains
Painted Rock Mountains
Phoenix Mountains
Sand Tank Mountains
Sierra Estrella
Salt River Mountains
Usery Mountains–Maricopa County -- (See: Usery Mountain Recreation Area.)
Vulture Mountains
White Tank Mountains

Pima County, Arizona

Agua Dulce Mountains
Ajo Range–Pima County
Little Ajo Mountains
Alvarez Mountains
Artesa Mountains
Baboquivari Mountains (Arizona)–Pima County; See: Baboquivari Peak Wilderness
Batamote Mountains
Bates Mountains
Brownell Mountains
Castle Mountains (Arizona)
Cerro Colorado Mountains( 4207 )(on eastern border of Sonoran Desert region)
Cimarron Mountains
Coyote Mountains (Arizona)
Crooked Mountains
Diablo Mountains (Arizona)
Empire Mountains
Gakolik Mountains
Granite Mountains (Arizona)–Pima County–see also: Granite Mountain (Arizona)-(Yavapai County)a separate "Granite Mountain" is in s. La Paz County
Growler Mountains
John the Baptist Mountains
La Lesna Mountains
Las Guijas Mountains
Little Ajo Mountains
Ajo Range
Mesquite Mountains
North Comobabi Mountains
Pozo Redondo Mountains
Puerto Blanco Mountains
Quijotoa Mountains
Quinlan Mountains( 5014 )(on eastern border of Sonoran Desert region-(northern extension of Baboquivari Mountains))
Roskruge Mountains
San Luis Mountains( 5369 )(on eastern border of Sonoran Desert region)
Santa Rosa Mountains (Arizona)
Sauceda Mountains
Sheridan Mountains
Sierra Blanca Mountains
Sierra de la Nariz
Sierra de Santa Rosa
Sierrita Mountains
Sikort Chuapo Mountains
Silver Bell Mountains
West Silver Bell Mountains
Sonoyta Mountains
South Comobabi Mountains
Tortolita Mountains( 4652 )(both in Madrean sky island region, and also on border of Sonoran Desert ranges-(northeast Madrean))
Tucson Mountains
Waterman Mountains
West Silver Bell Mountains
Silver Bell Mountains

On Eastern border of Sonoran Desert-(Madrean Sky Island)
Baboquivari Mountains (Arizona)( 7730 )Pima County; See: Baboquivari Peak Wilderness(on eastern border of Sonoran Desert region-(separated from the major groups of mountains by the Altar Valley)

Pinal County, Arizona
Mineral Mountains, Arizona
Sacaton Mountains (Arizona)
Tortolita Mountains( 4652 )
West Silver Bell Mountains

Yavapai County, Arizona

Bradshaw Mountains
Harcuvar Mountains
Hieroglyphic Mountains–Maricopa County -- (some in S. Yavapai County)

Yuma County, Arizona

Agua Caliente Mountains
Aguila Mountains
Bryan Mountains
Butler Mountains
Cabeza Prieta Mountains
Castle Dome Mountains
Copper Mountains
Gila Mountains (Yuma County)
Kofa Mountains–N. Yuma County - (S. La Paz County)
Laguna Mountains (Arizona)–Yuma County (see also: Laguna Mountains(Calif))
( Little Horn Mountains–S. La Paz County -- (N. Yuma County) )
Middle Mountains–S. La Paz County -- (N. Yuma County)
Mohawk Mountains
Muggins Mountains
( New Water Mountains–S. La Paz County -- (connected to Kofa Mountains, N. Yuma County) )
Palomas Mountains
Sierra Arida
Sierra de la Lechuguilla
Sierra Pinta
Tank Mountains
Tinajas Altas Mountains
Tule Mountains

See also
List of Madrean Sky Island mountain ranges - Sonoran - Chihuahuan Deserts
List of mountain ranges of Arizona

Sonoran Desert, List of mountain ranges of
-
Geography of Pima County, Arizona
-